The Sphinx is a lost 1916 silent film drama directed by John G. Adolfi and starring Effie Shannon and Herbert Kelcey.  It was produced and distributed by Universal Film Manufacturing Company.

Plot summary

Cast
 Herbert Kelcey - Arthur Macklin
 Effie Shannon - The Sphinx
 Beatrice Noyes - Betty Macklin
 Charles Compton - Charles Macklin
 Louise Huff - Frances Evans
 William Bechtel - Monsieur Valentine

References

External links
 
 
 
 
  The Sphinx trade advertisement(archived)

1916 films
American silent feature films
Lost American films
Films directed by John G. Adolfi
Universal Pictures films
American black-and-white films
Silent American drama films
1916 drama films
1916 lost films
Lost drama films
1910s American films
1910s English-language films